Anthony Hall (born March 17, 1950) is an American athlete. He competed in the men's javelin throw at the 1976 Summer Olympics.

References

External links
 

1950 births
Living people
Athletes (track and field) at the 1976 Summer Olympics
American male javelin throwers
Olympic track and field athletes of the United States
Athletes (track and field) at the 1975 Pan American Games
Pan American Games track and field athletes for the United States
Track and field athletes from Philadelphia
Universiade bronze medalists for the United States
Universiade medalists in athletics (track and field)
Medalists at the 1973 Summer Universiade